Encanto del Mar is a 2014 album of Mediterranean songs by Plácido Domingo. Singing in the baritone range, Domingo performs songs from diverse countries and regions around the Mediterranean Sea in eleven different languages, typically with simple accompaniments.

Track listing
"Mediterráneo" - Spanish
"Estate" (Bruno Martino and Bruno Brighetti) - Italian
"En Méditerranée" - French
"Aranjuez" - Spanish
"Anghjulina" - Corsican
"Torna a Surriento" - Neapolitan
"No potho reposare" - Sardinian
"Lamma bada" - Arabic (from Andalusia)
"Adio Kerida" - Ladino
"To Yasemi" - Greek (from Cyprus)
"Reginella" - Neapolitan
"Layla layla" - Hebrew
"El cant dels ocells" - Catalan
"Del Cabello Más Sutil" - Spanish
"Plaisir d'amour" - French (by Jean-Paul-Égide Martini (1741–1816))

Chart performance

Personnel
Plácido Domingo - lead vocals
Jelena Ciric - vocals
Barbara Furtuna - vocals
Cyro Baptista - percussion
Ira Coleman - bass
Hector del Curto - bandoneon
Gjorgi Dimcevski - violin
Mark Feldman - violin
Yacine Boulares - soprano saxophone
Bridget Kibbey - harp
Rhani Krija - percussion
Patrick Messina - clarinet
Chico Pinheiro - guitar
Mário Rossy - bass
Vincent Segal - cello

References 

2014 classical albums
Plácido Domingo albums